Barney Guillermo Williams (born March 13, 1977) is a Canadian rower who won a gold medal at the 2003 world championships in Milan and a silver in the same event at the 2004 Summer Olympics. He also has two wins and a second in the four in Rowing World Cup events. On April 18, 2021, Barney resigned from his position as head coach of the University of Victoria's women's varsity rowing program in mutual agreement with the athletic department. After several reports of demeaning and aggressive behaviour towards student athletes, Rowing Canada ruled he violated their code of conduct as well as the National Coaching Certification Program code of ethics. He was sanctioned with a 12-month ban from all Rowing Canada activities on April 20, 2021.

Biographical details
Born in the Argentine city of San Martín de los Andes, Williams was educated at Upper Canada College, the University of Victoria and then at Jesus College, University of Oxford where he was President of the Oxford University Boat Club. He studied at the University of Oxford from 2004 to 2006, completing a Diploma in Legal Studies and an MSc in Management Research. He rowed in the winning Blue Boat in the 2005 Oxford-Cambridge Boat Race and was the president of the victorious Oxford crew in the 2006 Boat Race. He is married to the Canadian rower Buffy-Lynne Williams, who won bronze in the women's eight at the 2000 Summer Olympics in Sydney Australia, and placed fourth in the women's pair at the 2004 Summer Olympics in Athens Greece.

Achievements
 Olympic Medals: 1 Silver
 World Championship Medals: 1 Gold
 Boat Race Appearances: 2 (2 wins)

Olympic Games
 2004 – Silver, Coxless Four (with Jake Wetzel, Thomas Herschmiller, Cameron Baerg)

World Championships
 2003 – Gold, Coxless Four (with Jake Wetzel, Thomas Herschmiller, Cameron Baerg)

References

External links 
 Oxford Boat Club crews
 Profile on WorldRowing

1977 births
Living people
People from Neuquén Province
Argentine emigrants to Canada
Canadian male rowers
Olympic silver medalists for Canada
Olympic rowers of Canada
Rowers at the 2004 Summer Olympics
Sportspeople from British Columbia
Upper Canada College alumni
Alumni of Jesus College, Oxford
Oxford University Boat Club rowers
Olympic medalists in rowing
Medalists at the 2004 Summer Olympics